Prabhanjanavarman or Prabhanjana Varman may refer to any of the following Indian kings:

 Prabhanjanavarman (Mathara dynasty)
 Prabhanjanavarman (Vasishtha dynasty)
 Nandaprabhanjanavarman